Utkin (from утка meaning a duck) is a Russian masculine surname, its feminine counterpart is Utkina. It may refer to
 Anatoly Utkin, Soviet serial killer in the late 1960s – early 1970s
 Anton Utkin, (born 1967), Russian writer
 Dmitri Utkin  (born 1984), Russian ice hockey player
 Dmitry Utkin, (born 1970), Russian busnissman and alleged founder of the Wagner Group
 Inna Utkina, Soviet pair skater
 Iosif Utkin (1903–1944), Russian poet
 Nikolai Utkin (1780–1863), Russian graphic artist, engraver and illustrator
 Jury Utkin (born 1939), Russian political figure, scientist
 Vasily Utkin (born 1972), Russian sports reporter
 Vladimir Utkin (1923–2000), Russian scientist and rocket engineer

See also
13477 Utkin
Utkina Dacha in Saint Petersburg, Russia

Russian-language surnames